An Election to Glasgow City Council was held on 1 May 1973, alongside municipal elections across Scotland. Of the councils 113 seats, 37 were up for election. Labour managed to increase its majority on the council to 55.

Following the election, Glasgow Corporation was composed of 83 Labour councillors, 25 Conservatives, 3 Progressives, and 2 ex officio members.

Turnout was 183,308, out of a total electorate of 601,506 (30.47% turnout).

Aggregate results

References

1973
Corporation election, 1973
Glasgow